Rogers is an unincorporated community in Roosevelt County, New Mexico, United States. Rogers has a post office with ZIP code 88132.

References

Unincorporated communities in Roosevelt County, New Mexico
Unincorporated communities in New Mexico